Stuart Millar (born 16 May 1965 in Bellshill), is a Scottish former football player and manager and former Director of Football at Airdrieonians.

Millar began his playing career with his home town club Airdrieonians, where he scored on his full debut at 17 years of age. He then joined Dundee, where he failed to make the breakthrough to the first team. He moved onto First Division club Montrose.

He then signed for Clyde, becoming Craig Brown's last signing as Clyde manager. He enjoyed the best spell of his career with Clyde, playing over 100 times for the club in 4 years. He then moved on to play for Alloa Athletic and Dumbarton. Stuart also had a successful spell playing in Cyprus with 1st Division club Evagoras Paphos. Whilst he was there the Cypriot club qualified for the UEFA Cup.

Following successful spells in junior football management with Carluke Rovers and Cumbernauld United, where they won 4 promotions, he became assistant manager at Stranraer, under Neil Watt. They were at Stair Park from 2003 until 2006. Highlights included winning the Third Division title in their first season, followed by a further successive promotion from the Second Division to the First Division. A record of their time at Stair Park is in Stuart's charity book - Stranraer FC - "The Neil Watt Years", which was published in 2009.

Millar was the chief scout at Ross County, a position he held from October 2007 to April 2010. Millar was appointed head coach of Clyde, but on 2 February 2011 he was sacked by Clyde.

Millar returned to his former position at Ross County in the summer of 2011. Millar resigned in the wake of manager Derek Adams and director of football George Adams being sacked. He was appointed to a scouting position with West Bromwich Albion in October 2014. He joined Dumbarton as chief scout in 2015, before leaving the club two years later to join Stranraer as head of recruitment. Millar then took up the position of Director of Football from April 2018 to March 2019  and was Director of Football at Airdrieonians until February 2021.

He became a scout at Bradford City in September 2021.

References

External links
 

Living people
1965 births
Footballers from Bellshill
Scottish footballers
Scottish football managers
Scottish expatriate footballers
Expatriate footballers in Cyprus
Airdrieonians F.C. (1878) players
Dundee F.C. players
Montrose F.C. players
Clyde F.C. players
Alloa Athletic F.C. players
Dumbarton F.C. players
Scottish Football League players
Cypriot First Division players
Clyde F.C. managers
Association football wingers
Kilsyth Rangers F.C. players
Scottish Football League managers
West Bromwich Albion F.C. non-playing staff
Evagoras Paphos players
Bradford City A.F.C. non-playing staff